Machan, Machaň, or Macháň (Czech and Slovak feminine: Machaňová or Macháňová) is a surname. Notable people with the surname include:

 Josef Machaň (1906–1979), Czech athlete
 Josef Machan (sport shooter) (born 1957), Czech sports shooter
 Matt Machan (born 1991), English cricketer
 Róbert Machán (born 1948), Hungarian tennis player
 Tibor Machan (1939–2016), Hungarian-American philosopher
 Tom Machan (born 1940s), Canadian football player

See also

References

Czech-language surnames